This article details the results and fixtures of the Japan national football team.

Head-to-head

The following table shows Japan's all-time international record, correct as of 13 October 2020.

On June 15, 2007 Japan Football Association announced, it had checked Japan matches, and changed the count and recognition. According to this decision, Japan has played in these times, till the game, on 2007/06/05, against Colombia:

 Japan National Team's Matches  -  1017 games
 Its International A-Matches    -   517 games

Best / Worst Results

Best

Worst

Results by years

1917–1939

1940s

1950s

1960s

1970s

1980s

1990s

2000s

2010s

2020s

Japan teams

Japan
Men's
 International footballers
 National football team (Results (2020–present))
 National under-23 football team
 National under-20 football team
 National under-17 football team
 National futsal team
 National under-20 futsal team
 National beach soccer team
Women's
 International footballers
 National football team (Results)
 National under-20 football team
 National under-17 football team
 National futsal team

See also
 Japan national football team head-to-head record
 Japan women's national football team results

References

External links
 List of International matches of Japan, JFA.jp 
  Worldfootball.net